These are the New Territories West results of the 2004 Hong Kong legislative election. The election was held on 12 September 2004 and all 8 seats in New Territories West, which consists of Tsuen Wan District, Tuen Mun District, Yuen Long District, Kwai Tsing District and Islands District, were contested. All the incumbents were elected with the new two seats gained by Lee Wing-tat of the Democratic Party and Selina Chow of the Liberal Party.

Overall results
Before election:

Change in composition:

Candidates list

See also
Legislative Council of Hong Kong
Hong Kong legislative elections
2004 Hong Kong legislative election

References

Elections in Hong Kong
2004 Hong Kong legislative election